is a Japanese comedian.

Galigali Galixon is represented with Yoshimoto Creative Agency in Osaka. He graduated from Kansai University First Junior High School and Kansai University First High School. Galigali Galixon won a degree from the Broadcasting Art College.

Filmography

TV series

TV drama

Films

Radio

Advertisements

References

External links
 

Japanese comedians
Kansai University alumni
1986 births
Living people
People from Hyōgo Prefecture